Damian Jan Las (born April 11, 2002) is an American professional soccer player who plays as a goalkeeper for Major League Soccer club Austin FC.

Club career

Fulham 
On September 11, 2019, it was announced that Las would join Fulham from the academy of MLS team Chicago Fire FC.

Loan to North Carolina FC 
On April 21, 2021, Las joined USL League One side North Carolina FC on loan ahead of their 2021 season. He made his debut on June 5, 2021, in a 2–1 loss vs. Fort Lauderdale CF. His first clean sheet came in a goalless draw vs. Tormenta FC on July 3, 2021. In August, his loan ended and he returned to Fulham.

Return to Fulham 
On November 19, 2021, Las made his debut for Fulham's under-23 team in a Premier League 2 match vs. Stoke City.  On November 24, Las made his first appearance in a matchday squad for Fulham, but was an unused substitute in a 0-0 draw vs. Derby County.

Austin FC
On January 25, 2022, Las moved to Major League Soccer side Austin FC, who acquired his homegrown rights from Chicago Fire.

International career 
Las played five matches for the United States under-17 team at the 2019 CONCACAF U-17 Championship, and kept three clean sheets in the process.

Career statistics

References

External links
 Profile at ussoccer.com
 

Living people
2002 births
American soccer players
United States men's youth international soccer players
Association football goalkeepers
Fulham F.C. players
North Carolina FC players
Austin FC players
USL League One players
American expatriate soccer players
American expatriate sportspeople in England
Expatriate footballers in England
American people of Polish descent
Soccer players from Illinois
People from Norridge, Illinois
Homegrown Players (MLS)